Gisburn railway station served the small village of Gisburn, which is now in Lancashire, England, but was in the West Riding of Yorkshire at the time. It was opened by the Lancashire and Yorkshire Railway in 1879. The station closed to passengers in September 1962, shortly before the Beeching Report was published.

Services

References 

Welch, M.S., Lancashire Steam Finale, 

Disused railway stations in Ribble Valley
Former Lancashire and Yorkshire Railway stations
Railway stations in Great Britain opened in 1879
Railway stations in Great Britain closed in 1962